Aqueduct Lock (Number 8) is a lock on the River Lee Navigation close to Turnford.

Location 
The lock is located in the River Lee Country Park and is adjacent to the Old River Lea and the  Holyfield Lake which incorporates part of the River Lee Flood Relief Channel

The aqueduct above the lock carries the Small River Lea under the Navigation, which flows from the nearby Old River Lea.

Public access 
Vehicular access at Wharf Road, Wormley car park.

Pedestrian and cycles via the towpath which forms part of the Lea Valley Walk.

Public transport
 Broxbourne railway station
 Cheshunt railway station
 Bus timetables

External links
 Holyfield Lake
 Aqueduct Lock-a history

Locks of the Lee Navigation
Locks in Essex
Locks in Hertfordshire
Navigable aqueducts in England
Transport infrastructure completed in 1922